Hana Tsu-Vachel is the main protagonist and a player character of the Fear Effect series. She was introduced in Fear Effect in 1999 for the PlayStation. She is notable for the depiction of her romantic relationship with Rain Qin in the game's 2001 prequel Fear Effect 2: Retro Helix.

Appearances

In video games

Hana is a freelancer of French and Chinese descent who was once a teenage prostitute and a member of a vast criminal organization known as the Triad. In fact, the Triad still claim her as their property, and it is in part to earn enough money to buy back her "contract" that she works such high-risk and high-paying assignments. Brash and edgy with a penchant for sarcasm, Hana is as skillful with her tongue as she is with using firearms and piloting vehicles, able to finagle or flirt her way out of many difficult situations but equally capable of solving problems with weapons if need be. In spite of a demonstrated level of sophistication, she is not above using sex as a weapon.

Hana's close partner and male love interest is another mercenary, Glas Royce. In Fear Effect 2: Retro Helix, her friend and lover is Rain Qin, a female hacker with a past shrouded in secrecy who Hana discovered during a mission a few years before the story begins.

In other media

Retro Helix gained some notoriety for a suggestive advertisement campaign in gaming magazines, hinting at a lesbian relationship between Hana and Rain. Director Stan Liu would go on to state in various interviews that Hana and Rain were not necessarily lesbians, but simply two women who in this particular instance had developed a physical relationship. In fact, the only scene in the game itself that matches the overt sexuality of the steamy ads is one where the two women disrobe on an elevator and embrace specifically to distract the male guards watching them on a security camera - most of the game is actually spent with the duo apart and talking via radio. Liu suggests that human relationships are not so black and white as to be reduced to categories, but often fall into a grey area. According to GameCritics.com, "Publisher Eidos may have played up the girls-gone-wild lesbo angle by having [...] Hana Tsu-Vachel and Rain Qin, straddling each other in their underwear for the print ads, but the actual game wasn't the promiscuous orgy that ads teased."

Hana also stars in two Image single-issue comics based on both Fear Effect games. In 2004–2006, German film maker Uwe Boll planned to make a live-action film featuring "sexy heroines Hana and Rain in a much edgier fashion."

Reception
According to a review by GameSpot's Frank Provo, "Rain and Hana's relationship ultimately proves itself to be the game's tearful legacy." GameSpot's Carrie Gouskos featured Hana and Rain in their article "Great Loves", despite being portrayed "in more of a 'hey dude, it's hot lesbians making out!' way", but noting rarity of video game female homosexual characters before them "so Hana and Rain's relationship, while at times gratuitous, was nonetheless quite interesting." GamesRadar US called them "the sexiest lesbian heroines ever to appear on PlayStation." In 2007, Alexander Villafania of Inquirer.net featured them on the list of ten "most memorable video game love teams", stating "just imagine Lara Croft and Joanna Dark making out in a video game," citing the promotional posters. In 2011, UGO.com included the "hard-edged heroine" Hana on the list of top 11 "girls of gaming", remembering her for "hot body and unique style," but most of all for "the suggestive ad campaign for Fear Effect: Retro Helix, which depicted Hana and her new... friend Rain Quin in some very suggestive poses." PlayStation Official Magazine included Hana among the ten characters they wanted to appear in PlayStation All-Stars Battle Royale, stating: "Consider these reasons for Hana’s inclusion: she’s a half French, half Chinese assassin; she’s packing an entire arsenal of inexplicably concealed weaponry; she’s locked in a battle for her soul with the King of Hell. See? Didn’t even mention the unzipped catsuit." In 2013, Hana was ranked as the 28th greatest heroine in video game history by Michael Rougeau of Complex, who commented that "the fact that she's an openly gay protagonist makes her even more of a badass, even if that relationship is somewhat sexualized for a male audience."

In 2010, GameTrailers included her on their countdown of the top 10 "babes who are out of your league" at number three. UGO.com included Hana among the 50 "video game hotties" in 2011, commenting: "We're all for a little girl-on-girl action, especially because the game's director wanted to make sure that fans understood that Hana 'swings both ways.' Duly noted." In 2012, both Hana and Rain ranked 27th on the list of "hottest" video game characters by Larry Hester of Complex, as well as placing at number spot on the list of "hottest female video game characters" by Kristie Bertucci of Gadget Review. 

On the other hand, Dave Meikleham of GamesRadar included her on the list of "game characters that deserved to die" for her possibility to die of fright during the gameplay, calling her "a big scaredy cat who has no place in the survival horror genre." Anthony Burch of Destructoid criticized the prequel, stating that "instead of remembering Hana, Glas, Deke, and a supernatural crime story, gamers remember the absurd lesbian relationship between Hana and Whatsherface." According to Destructoid's Conrad Zimmerman, "Hana's homosexual attitudes in Fear Effect 2 raised a fair bit of controversy at the time, with some groups shocked at the flagrant sexuality on display while others simply hoped they'd get a little more action out of Hana. Sadly, the latter would wind up the more disappointed."

See also
List of female action heroes and villains

References

Action-adventure game characters
Fictional assassins in video games
Fictional criminals in video games
Female characters in video games
Fictional American people in video games
Fictional bisexual females
Fictional gangsters
Fictional prostitutes
Horror video game characters
Image Comics female characters
LGBT characters in video games
Fictional mercenaries in video games
Orphan characters in video games
Science fiction video game characters
Video game characters introduced in 1999
Video game protagonists